Sabah Football Club is a Malaysian professional football club with ownership by Sabah Football Club Sdn Bhd. The football club competes in Malaysia's football league representing the state of Sabah in Borneo, Malaysia. They currently compete in Malaysia's top division professional football league, the Malaysia Super League. The team's home matches are played at the 35,000 capacity Likas Stadium in Kota Kinabalu, the capital city of Sabah.

The team won the Malaysia FA Cup in 1995, the Malaysian Premier League (top tier) in 1996, and the Malaysia Premier League (second tier) in 2019. In 1995, the team also advanced to the second round of the Asian Cup Winners' Cup after beating An Giang of V-League by 3–1 on aggregate, subsequently losing to Bellmare Hiratsuka (now Shonan Bellmare) of J-League by an aggregate score of 1–7.

Before 2021, the club was one of the 14 state teams in the Malaysian football system and was known as Sabah FA or Sabah FA State Football Team. It was funded and managed by the Sabah Football Association (SaFA) and relied mostly on state government grants. However, in 2021, the Malaysian football league mandated that all teams in the top two leagues must be professional clubs, leading to the privatization of Sabah FC.

Both fans and non-fans of Malaysian football may know the club as Sabah FA, as it was run by SaFA. However, those familiar with the sport simply refer to the club as Sabah.

Club licensing regulations

Eligibility
 This club had obtained the FAM Club License to play in the 2020 Malaysia Super League season after becoming 2019 Malaysia Premier League champion.
 This club had obtained the AFC Club License and is eligible to played either 2023 AFC Champions League or 2023 AFC Cup if qualified on merit.
 Sabah FC had obtained privatization and owned by Sabah Football Club Sdn Bhd in 2021.

History 

From the 1950s until 1963, Sabah competed as North Borneo football team in the Borneo Cup together with Sarawak football team and Brunei national football team. Following the formation of the Federation of Malaysia, the North Borneo Football Association (NBFA) changed its name to Sabah Football Association (Sabah FA). Sabah qualify into the Malaysia Cup for the first time in 1977 and enter the competition in 1978.

Amateur and semi-pro era 

Sabah was a well known team during the Malaysian football amateur and semi-pro era as state team produced many quality players namely the trio of James Wong, Hassan Sani and Peter Rajah. These players during their time led Sabah to become one of Malaysian football's most feared teams during the 80's. One fine example was during the 1979 Malaysian League where Sabah started slowly. After a run of 8 matches, they stood with 3 wins, 2 draws and 3 losses but, during the later stages they stepped up a gear or five by winning all their remaining 8 matches with most of them by huge margins, including an incredible 8–0 thrashing of Sarawak, 11–0 hammering of Perak and the 6–1 beating of Terengganu. At the end of the season, Sabah finished as runners-up behind Singapore and became the highest scoring team with 49 goals in 12 games, which is an average of 3 goals per game. In 1991, Sabah striker Matlan Marjan became the first Malaysian to score a double against England in 'A' international matches on 12 June 1991.

Professional era 
When professional football was introduced by Football Association of Malaysia (FAM), Sabah also made a reputation of being one of the Malaysian League's most competitive teams. Quality professional players were produced from the ranks during the 1990s, most notably Matlan who helped Sabah finish as runners-up during 1993 and 1994 Malaysia FA Cup, and who at one time was appointed as the national team captain by the then Malaysian national team coach Claude Le Roy. The positive results gained from the beginning of professional era however was cut short by the match fixing scandal that rocked Malaysian football in 1994. The scandal almost destroyed Sabah and Malaysian football in general. Matlan was the one of several players found guilty for being involved in the scandal. As a punishment for their involvement in match fixing, he and the other players were banned for life by FIFA from being involved in football and banished from the state of Sabah by the state government under the Restricted Residence Act. After the scandal, Sabah began its rebuilding process to regain their reputation in Malaysian football. Sabah won their first professional trophy, the Malaysia FA Cup in 1995. In the 1996 season, Sabah won their first league title and went through to the final of the Malaysia Cup for the first time but were beatened by Selangor on penalties. David Rocastle, Sabah reached the final of the 1998 Malaysia FA Cup. With The 2000 season could be considered as Sabah's worst since joining the Malaysian professional league. They were relegated to the second division and could not get past the group stages of the Malaysia Cup. However, Sabah quickly regained its performance in the 2001 season where they finished as runners-up behind Johor FC. In the 2002 season, Sabah lining up players of calibre such as Zainizam Marjan, Khairul Azman Mohamed and foreign striker Josiah Seton, finished third in the league and again managed to get through to the final of Malaysia Cup by beating Selangor Public Bank and Perak. Sabah however finished as runners-up yet again by losing to the same team that beat them in 1996 final, Selangor. This time, Sabah lost by 'golden goal' scored by Mohd Amri Yahyah. In 2003, Sabah again finished third in Liga Premier One. Sabah again reached the final of Malaysia Cup. This time they lost to club-side Selangor MPPJ by 0–3, with hat-trick from Juan Manuel Arostegui.

Early years in the Malaysian Super League 
When the Malaysia Super League (MSL) was introduced in 2004, Sabah struggled to be competitive against other teams in the top league. Sabah only managed to stay in Super League for two seasons as they were relegated to Malaysia Premier League (MPL) for the 2005/06 season. After the relegation to 2nd tier league, Sabah continued to struggle for promotion to get back into the top division. They lost to Pahang in the 2006/07 season play-off for a place in 2007/08 Malaysia Super League.

All local players seasons 
After 6 years playing in the 2nd tier MPL, Australian coach Gary Phillips was able to guide Sabah to promotion in 2010 – his first season in charge. After poor results which have affected Sabah's performance in the 2011 league and also the cup, Gary Phillips was replaced by Justin Ganai to save Sabah from relegation zone. Justin improved Sabah performance in 2011 Malaysia Cup where the team reached the quarterfinals. He was retained as head coach for the 2012 MSL season but step down as the league game were 2 games left. Sabah also relegated back to MPL after lose to Kedah in play-off match by which Pahang (was MPL side) won the play-off. Salt was added to the wound as the relegation was followed by them failing to qualify to the group stage of the 2012 Malaysia Cup.

Foreign players returns 
Sabah started their 2013 season back in MPL as their main defenders, Sipitang duo Ronny Harun and Mafry Balang left for Borneo rival Sarawak and Bongawan young striker Rozaimi Abdul Rahman was loaned out to Harimau Muda A. 2013 season was led by Northern Irishman, David McCreery and they end up in 5th place but still available for Malaysia Cup play-off by which they lose heavily 0–4 to Negeri Sembilan at Shah Alam Stadium. McCreery left at the end of the season with disappointment. 
The year 2014 saw a major changes in the team's sponsorship by which local brand Carino was signed as their kit supplier and Ararat Sports plus BSA as their sponsors. During this season, Sabah ex-player and also a legend in 90's, Milomir Šešlija become their head coach replacing McCreery in the hot seat. National striker, Rozaimi and winger/midfielder Maxsius Musa also returned after their loan to Harimau Muda A and Harimau Muda B respectively finished. But to no avail, they finished 8th out of 12 in the MPL, missed the Malaysia Cup group stage for third consecutive seasons and also kicked out from FA Cup in the early stage. This was worse than the 2013 season. Milomir's contract was not renewed at the end of the season.

Just after 2014 season finished, another major changes was made by which George O'Callaghan was signed as their Technical Director and Justin is back as temporary head coach. Sabah FA chief executive officer TC Goh also came as team manager by which he and O'Callaghan makes a big signings. Carino remained as their kit supplier but only for the women team, futsal team, President Cup and U19 team. Adidas, Globaltech, UZMA, Grace One, BSA and Ararat Sports are their current sponsors. Sabah FA successfully signed twice African Player of The Year, El Hadji Diouf and his compatriot Abdoulaye Faye followed by Irish-born Libyan footballer, Éamon Zayed and Singaporean striker Fazrul Nawaz. Fazrul and O'Callaghan were released early in the season few weeks before Malaysia Premier League kick off. Fazrul was replaced with Joel Chianese during the mid-season transfer window in April and O'Callaghan was replaced with Brisbane Roar ex-head coach Mike Mulvey in February 2015. Both Chianese and Mulvey are Australian. After 3 games working as technical director, Mulvey was appointed as the new head coach while Justin went back to the President Cup team. During this current season, fans began to return and fill the home stadium. But as the seasons passing by, Sabah lose mostly of their matches during the second half of the season. Diouf's dissatisfaction with Sabah FA management plans, along with his dismissal during few of Sabah's matches thus allowing youngster Leopold Alphonso and Rawilson Batuil respectively to skip the team. Promising start of 2015 season end with huge disappointment for the team as they sit at 7th place, missing Malaysia Cup automatic slot and also the play-off. TC Goh, Mulvey and big name players such as Diouf, Zayed, Faye and Chianese plus local golden boy, Rozaimi Abdul Rahman left at the end of the season due to no contract renewal.

Asian & ASEAN player quota introduced 
Following much efforts and various reorganisation made on the team, Sabah FA was crowned as the champion of the 2019 Malaysia Premier League for the first time since they last lifted the old first division title back in 1996. Having early secured various imports such as Brazilian Luiz Júnior, South Korean defender Park Tae-soo and Serbian midfielder Luka Milunović in the 1st leg transfer before securing another two important players such as Angolan striker Aguinaldo da Veiga together with Turkmenistan midfielder Ahmet Ataýew in the 2nd leg transfer that was combined with Serbian striker Rodoljub Paunović and various local talents, the team able to won thirteen matches from a total of 19 matches thus qualifying the 2020 Malaysia Super League.

Malaysian Football League Privatisation Era
Starting from the 2021 season, all clubs competing in the 2021 Malaysia Super League and the Malaysia Premier League, must be privatised as required by the Football Association of Malaysia(FAM) . Sabah Football Club Sdn. Bhd. was formed in order to fulfill the condition in order to compete in the 2021 season of Malaysia Super League. Local Businessman Dato' Verdon Bahanda was official appointed as the chief executive officer(CEO) of Sabah Football Club Sdn. Bhd. on the 12th of November 2020.

Crest and colours 

Being a Malaysian state football team competing in the Malaysian football league system before 2021, the team wore kits with the crest of the Sabah Football Association (SaFA) on them, whenever they play any competitive match. In November 2020 and following the privatisation of the club, Sabah FC displayed the club's new official logo on its Facebook page which was chosen following a competition to create the Sabah FC's logo. During the time, Sabah Football Club Sdn Bhd in its statement informed that the logo was created by an individual named Firzaruddin Zainal Abiddin. Apart from fulfilling the design requirements, the logo was chosen in the competition based on the one voted by the most fans as fans at the time get to vote on which logo they like on the team's Facebook page.

Stadiums 

 Likas Stadium - 
 Penampang Stadium - 
 Tawau Stadium - 

Likas Stadium is the current official home ground for Sabah Football Club.
Penampang Stadium is occasionally used for afternoon matches, usually when Likas Stadium was renovated or if floodlights require maintenance. Tawau Sports Complex is a regular venue that is only used sometimes for the Malaysia Premier League.

Kit manufacturers and main sponsors

Club culture

Supporters 
 Bola Sepak Sabah
 Football Fans of Sabah
 Kelab Penyokong Sabah Rhino
 North Borneo Ultras (NBU)
 Sabah Football Fans Club
 SabahRhinos.com since 1997
 Tawau City Hoodlum (TCH)
 The Rhinos Troops
 Sabah Diehard
 The Voice of Rhinos#12
 RedBois City (RBC)
 Universiti Malaysia Sabah (UMS)

Mascot 
Sabah FA first mascot was the Rhino since mid-1990s. In 2010 SAFA rebranded the struggling team mascot to Hawk which was controversial as Kuala Lumpur FA at that time was also known as the Hawks. Sabah FA reinstated its name as the Rhinos starting from 2015. In 2019, Sabah FA once again rebranded as Tambadau.

During 2021 privatization process, Sabah FC was chosen as the new club name and Rhino once again became the official mascot.

Rivalry 
Sabah FC neighbouring rival is Sarawak United FC with both claiming the title of 'the best in Borneo' and referred to as the Borneo Derby.

Broadcasting 
Radio coverage of regular season matches are broadcast on Sabah FM 89.9 in Malay language.

Honours

Club records 

Note:
 Pld = Played, W = Won, D = Drawn, L = Lost, F = Goals for, A = Goals against, Pts= Points, Pos = Position

Source:

Performances in AFC competitions 
Asian Cup Winners' Cup: 1 appearance
1995: Round of 16

Players

First-team squad

Transfers and contracts

In

Pre-season

Mid-season

(HIDE)

Out

Pre-season

Mid-season

Current coaching staff

Development squad

U21 squad

Current coaching staff 

:

U19 squad

Current coaching staff

Managers and coaches

Managers 

  Goh Thian Chuan (1999, 2015)
  Osman Jamal (2000–2001)
  Mohd Joehari Mohd Ayub (2004–2005)
  Abdul Rahman Zakaria (2006–2009, 2014)
  Mohd Asyraaf Fong Abdullah (2009)
  Gary Phillips (2010–2011)
  Shahriman Abdullah (2011–2012)
  Alijus Sipil (2013–2014)
  Adlane Messelem (2017)
  Juil Nuatim (2018)
  Peter Anthony (2018-2020)
 Jelius Ating (2020-2022)
 Ong Kim Swee (2023-Present)

Head Coach 

  Stanley Chew (197?–1979, 1985, 1987–1988)
  Gerd Schmidt (1980–1983)
  James Wong (1984)
  Azah Ezrein (1986)
  Frank Upton (1989–1990)
  Roy Lorenson (1990–1992)
  Oldřich Sedláček (1992–1995)
  Kelly Tham (1995–1996)
  Ron Smith (1996–1997)
  Ken Shellito (1998)
  Justin Ganai (1999, 2005–2006, 2011–2012, 2015)
  Ken Worden (1999)
  David Woodfield (2000–2001)
  Peter Butler (2001–2004)
  José Garrido (2004–2005)
  José Luis (2005)
  Drago Mamić (2007–2008)
  Wathiq Naji Jasim (2008–2009)
  Mohd Asyraaf Fong Abdullah (2009)
  Gary Phillips (2010–2011)
  Andrew Majjangkim (2012)
  David McCreery (2012–2013)
  Johnny Dominicus (2013)
  Milomir Šešlija (2013–2014)
  Mike Mulvey (2015)
  Vjeran Simunić (2015–2016)
  Steve Vilmiaire (2016–2017)
  Jelius Ating (2017–2019)
  Kurniawan Dwi Yulianto (2020) 
  Lucas Kalang Laeng (2020-2021)
  Kurniawan Dwi Yulianto (2021) 
  Burhan Ajui (caretaker)
  Ong Kim Swee (2021-Present)

Coach history 
The following coaches won at least one trophy when in charge of Sabah:

Former notable players 
Notable former players that represented their national team:

  El-Hadji Diouf
  Syed Adney
  Mohd Anis Faron
  Bobby Gonzales
  Sumardi Hajalan
  Ronny Harun
  Mohd Fareed Shah Hassan
  G. Jeevananthan
  Wong Sai Kong
  Dass Gregory Kolopis
  Matlan Marjan
  Zainizam Marjan
  Khairul Azman Mohamed
  Julamri Muhammad
  Rozaimi Abdul Rahman
  Peter Rajah
  David Rocastle
  Hassan Sani
  Ong Kim Swee
  James Wong

Football clubs

Affiliated clubs with Sabah F.C. 

  Kinabalu Jaguar F.C. 
  Cebagoo
  Tawau Army
  DYS
  KDMM
  Likas Utd
  Merotai
  Indah Utd
  PRESTA
  Ranhill
  Tenom Juta

Affiliated clubs outside Sabah F.C. 
  Sarawak

References

External links 
 
 Sabah football supporters website
 Sabah FA team latest statistics
 Sabah FA individual player stats



 
Malaysia Premier League clubs
Football clubs in Malaysia
Association football clubs established in 1963
1963 establishments in Malaysia
Football associations in Malaysia
Sports organizations established in 1963